Watts Hill is a hill in the Dorset Downs and one of the highest in the county of Dorset, England. The height of the summit is variously recorded as 261 metres or 262 metres.

Location 
Watts Hill lies about 1½ miles north of Cerne Abbas above the village of Minterne Parva, and about 12 kilometres north of Dorchester, the county town. It is the highest point on a north-south ridge, on the southern spur of which is the Cerne Abbas Giant, an old landmark whose origin is unclear. A mile to the northwest is Dogbury Hill and, on the far side of the A352 is Telegraph Hill and High Stoy, a popular filming location.

History 
There is much evidence of prehistoric settlement in the area. Near the Giant there are the remains of an ancient settlement, a tumulus and an earthwork on the southern spur near Cerne Abbas, and similar features further north near Dogbury.

References 

Hills of Dorset